The South African national cricket team toured Zimbabwe in August 2007 and played a three-match series of Limited Overs Internationals (LOI) which South Africa won 3–0 against the Zimbabwean national cricket team. South Africa were captained by Graeme Smith and Zimbabwe by Prosper Utseya.

References

External links

2007 in South African cricket
2007 in Zimbabwean cricket
South African cricket tours of Zimbabwe
International cricket competitions in 2007–08
Zimbabwean cricket seasons from 2000–01